Florian Vogel (born 2 September 1994 in Bayreuth) is a German swimmer. At the 2016 Summer Olympics in Rio de Janeiro, Vogel placed 9th in the heats of the 400 metre freestyle and did not qualify for the final. He also competed as a member of the 4 x 200 freestyle relay team which finished in 6th place.

References

External links 
 
 
 
 

1994 births
Living people
German male swimmers
Place of birth missing (living people)
Olympic swimmers of Germany
Swimmers at the 2016 Summer Olympics
Sportspeople from Bayreuth
21st-century German people
20th-century German people